Chae Myung-shin (November 27, 1926 – November 25, 2013) was a South Korean army officer who commanded South Korean military forces in the Vietnam War. He was also the co-founder of the Korean Taekwondo Association.

Early life
Chae Myung-shin was born on November 27, 1926, in Koksan County, to a father who was an anti-Japanese activist and a devout Christian mother, and grew up as a native believer. His father was imprisoned and was released shortly after independence of Korea in 1945, but died in early December 1945 due to the aftereffects of torture, and his mother worked as a member of the church.

Career
In 1944, at the age of 19, Chae was conscripted into the Imperial Japanese Army and participated in training. After training, he was stationed at South Pyongan Province. Following the independence of Korea in 1945, he attended and graduated from Pyongyang Normal School. Chae was appointed as a teacher to Deokhae Elementary School in Yonggang, South Pyongan Province. Afterwards, he taught at Jinnampo Elementary School, but following the Soviet occupation of the northern part of Korean Peninsula, Chae met Kim Il-sung, North Korea’s founder, at the opening ceremony of the Pyongyang Institute, a military and political academy. Kim proposed that he and Chae work together, though Chae managed to decline his offer.

Chae moved to the southern part of Korean Peninsula in 1947, to escape communism. After breaking up with his mother and family who were in the church at the time, Chae moved alone and arrived in Seoul.

In 1948, he applied for the 5th cadet recruitment of the Chosun Defense Academy and passed. In his nine months in the Defense Academy, he was the top performer in his class, and scored the 26th position out of the 400 students, at the time of graduation. After graduating from the 5th term of the Military Academy, he was appointed as second lieutenant. On the same year, Chae and other eight soldiers were sent to Jeju Island in order to suppress the uprising by Workers' Party of South Korea and Jeju Provincial Party. In 1949, he took part in battles against communist forces near the city of Kaesong. In 1949, he was stationed at Mount Taebaeksan, where he was tasked to subdue the communist guerrillas in South Korea. At that time, the communist partisans were engaged in guerrilla warfare in the mountainous regions of Gangwon-do and Gyeongbuk. In Gangwon-do, Chae reunited with his mother since leaving North Korea in 1947. After being reunited with her, they separated three weeks later.

Korean War

Following the start of Korean War in 1950, Chae commanded Skeleton Unit (백골병단). The unit infiltrated into North Korea to accomplish a special mission and rendered distinguished military services. In 1951, Chae led his unit deep into north of the 38th parallel. They were isolated twice because of the encirclement of the Korean People’s Army, but managed to escape.

In May 1951, the Korean People's Army laid siege on Chae's unit and had them surrounded. However, he led a successful breakthrough but suffered heavy casualties due to cold and hunger. Regardless, the combat experiences of the unit during this period have not only become the actual combat model and the subject of war history research in the South Korean Army, but has even been applied to the tactics against the Viet Cong, during the Vietnam War. Chae also served as the battalion commander of the 1st Battalion of the 21st Regiment of the 8th Infantry Division in the Korean War, and led the troops in the expedition in North. In 1951, the 11th Regiment was formed and he served as its head. He became the authority on guerrilla tactics of the South Korean Army.

Post war

In 1953, following the signing of Korean Armistice Agreement, Chae was promoted to colonel. He served as the chief of the 5th Regiment of the 7th Infantry Division, the Chief of Staff of the 3rd Infantry Division, and the leader of the 60th Regiment of the 20th Infantry Division. When he was the staff officer of the 3rd Infantry Division, he was under the command of the same division of future President of South Korea Park Chung-hee. In 1954, he served as the 3rd Army Combat Staff and Chief of the Combat Planning Division of the Army Headquarters. From October 1955, he served at the No.2 Training Center in Nonsan, where he worked as a director to improve the habits and remove irregularities within the Nonsan Recruit Training Center. During his time, he served with the 9th Infantry Division.

After he was promoted to brigadier general in August 1958, he served as the combat staff of the First Field Army, commander of the 38th Infantry Division, and the commander of the 5th Infantry Division. He led the 5th Infantry Division and participated in the May 16 Coup in 1961, which led to installing a reformist military Supreme Council for National Reconstruction effectively led by Park Chung-hee and led to end of the Second Republic of Korea.

In 1962, he co-founded the Korean Taekwondo Association and served as the founding chairman until 1964. During his tenure, he promoted the connection between Taekwondo and the military, unified the various schools, formulated common regulations and organized the first taekwondo promotion and review within South Korea. But because he concurrently serves as the chairman and important positions in the military government, many conference affairs of the association are entrusted to the deputy chairman.

After being promoted to major general in 1963, he served as deputy chief of the combat staff in the army headquarters. In 1964, he attended the U.S. Army Command and General Staff College in Fort Leavenworth, Kansas. After returning to South Korea, he served as the commander of the 3rd district.

Vietnam War

In April 1965, Chae was summoned to the Blue House to meet with Park Chung-hee, in order to discuss opinions regarding the dispatch of combat troops to Vietnam. Chae initially expressed opposition in sending South Korean troops to Vietnam due to his belief that the 
South Korean Army are not adapted to the environmental conditions of the Viet Cong and the jungles of Vietnam, but also might affect South Korea’s defense and economy. In addition, Chae predicted that guerrilla warfare would be difficult, and that if the ROK forces participated in the Vietnam War, they would face a tough fight against the jungle warfare adapted Viet Cong.

However, President Park Chung-hee wanted to send troops to Vietnam due to the economic and military advantages it would give Korea as Korea had offered to send troops to Vietnam earlier but was rejected until eventually, the offer was accepted by the United States. 

With the need for diplomacy, Park Chung-hee decided to use the South Korean military forces to enter Vietnam to participate in the war. Chae finally agreed and went to Saigon, South Vietnam to command the South Korean troops in Vietnam. At that time in Vietnam, General William Westmoreland, the commander of the Military Assistance Command, Vietnam, wanted to create a command system headed by the U.S. military, and incorporating the Australian Army and the South Korean Army within it. However, the South Korean troops under the Korean command in Vietnam did not want to even look like mercenaries under the U.S. military in the system. In the end, Chae and Westmoreland reached a 'gentleman's agreement', which led to setting up a three-nation committee, so that Chae and the U.S. military staff officer in Vietnam would have positions within it. U.S. Army Major General Stanley R. Larsen essentially mastered the command of South Korean forces to develop South Korean Army's missions, operational and regional roles. Chae used his guerrilla warfare experience during the Korean War to implement tough tactics within the South Korean Army to deal with the Viet Cong.

Chae adopted strong tactics for the Vietnamese as an authority on guerrilla tactics, which involved the routine practice of hostage taking and reprisals, while laying blame on the Viet Cong for purported atrocities. Chae's harsh policy caused a serious disagreement with William Westmoreland, the chief of staff of the United States Forces. On 1968, the Phong Nhị and Phong Nhất massacre occurred. Westmoreland several times demanded Chae should investigate. But Chae replied the criminals were Viet Cong. 
However, an investigation conducted by Colonel Robert Morehead Cook of the U.S. Army Inspector General's office, published a report that pointed out that the culprits were the Blue Dragon Division of the South Korean Marine Corps.

During his time in Vietnam, Chae also engaged in the popularization of taekwondo during the war. In 1965, he founded the Vietnam Taekwondo Association (월남태권도협회). At the same time, Chae concurrently served as the chief of staff of the South Korean Army, and subsequently wrote a Vietnam War memoir titled The Vietnam War and I.

For his military services in Vietnam, he was decorated by U.S. President Richard Nixon and South Vietnamese President Nguyễn Văn Thiệu.

Post war
On May 3, 1969, Chae was relieved of the position of commander of the South Korean military forces in Vietnam. He flew back to Seoul by a military plane from South Vietnam, to serve as the commander of the 2nd Field Army Command in South Korea. Park Chung-hee also met him in 1972 and appreciated Chae's military services in Vietnam.

But at that time, Park Chung-hee was busy consolidating power for the third time and was preparing to establish a Fourth Republic of Korea. After that, Chae disagreed with Park regarding his attempts to consolidate his power further and expressed his opposition several times, especially after the approval of the Yushin Constitution, to expand the president’s term and control. In the end, Chae was removed from the list of promoted generals when the military personnel changed. On June 1, 1972, he left from his final position as commander of the 2nd Field Army, and retired from military service at the rank of lieutenant general.

Later life

Following his retirement from military on the same year, Chae was sent to Stockholm, to serve as South Korea's ambassador to Sweden. On 1973, he was appointed as the South Korea's ambassador to Greece and was sent to Athens. His final diplomatic position was as South Korea ambassador to Brazil in 1977, before completely retiring in 1981.

In 2000, Chae was newly appointed as the chairman of the Vietnam War Companionship Association (베트남참전전우회). In 2004, he was appointed as the chairman of the Korean War Compatriots' Association (6.25참전유공자회), and the president of Vietnam War Companionship Association (유트남참전전우회).

On November 25, 2013, he died at the age of 88 from gallbladder cancer, while admitted at Severance Hospital in Seoul. In accordance to his wishes, he was buried next to the soldiers who died during the Vietnam War at Seoul National Cemetery.

Personal life
Chae was married to Moon Jeong-in, who was born to a wealthy family in North Gyeongsang Province and a graduate of Ewha Womans University. They had two daughters and one son.

Chae was a Protestant.

Awards and decorations
His awards include:

See also
Republic of Korea Armed Forces
South Korea in the Vietnam War

References

1926 births
South Korean military personnel of the Korean War
South Korean military personnel
South Korean generals
2013 deaths
Ambassadors of South Korea to Brazil
Ambassadors of South Korea to Greece
Ambassadors of South Korea to Sweden
Korean military personnel of the Vietnam War
South Korean Protestants
South Korean anti-communists
South Korean male taekwondo practitioners
Recipients of the Legion of Merit
Non-U.S. alumni of the Command and General Staff College
Korea Military Academy alumni
Recipients of the Order of Military Merit (Korea)
Imperial Japanese Army personnel of World War II
Deaths from gallbladder cancer
Deaths from cancer in South Korea
People from North Hwanghae
Burials at Seoul National Cemetery